The 2019 NAB League Boys season was the 28th season of the NAB League Boys competition; the NAB League (formerly known as the TAC Cup) is an under-19 Australian rules football representative competition held in Victoria, Australia. The season started on the 23rd of March and concluded with the 2019 NAB League Grand Final on September 21st. Oakleigh Chargers defeated Eastern Ranges by 53 points in the grand final, earning that team's fifth premiership.

Ladder

Finals series

Finals Week 1

Finals Week 2

Finals Week 3

Finals Week 4

Grand Final

Academy Series
This was the first season the NAB AFL Academy Series was incorporated into the NAB League. The series was fixtured for the three northern state academy teams, NT Thunder and Tasmania, with the team that finishes on top of the academy-specific ladder crowned the winners. The winners of the series were the Gold Coast Suns.

Ladder

References

NAB League
Nab League